Sporosalibacterium tautonense is a Gram-positive, strictly anaerobic, thermotolerant, moderately halophilic, organotrophic and motile bacterium from the genus of Sporosalibacterium which has been isolated from water from the TauTona gold mine in South Africa.

References

Clostridiaceae
Bacteria described in 2017
Bacillota